The Lawrence Realization Stakes was an American horse race first run on the turf in 1889. The race, for three-year-old Thoroughbred colts, geldings and fillies, was last run in 2005.

History
Inaugurated at the Sheepshead Bay Race Track at Gravesend, New York, it was held there until 1913. At that time, the race was the richest stakes for three-year-olds in the United States.

It was run as the Realization Stakes until 1899, when it was renamed to honor James G. K. Lawrence, president of the Coney Island Jockey Club (which owned the racetrack). Lawrence was also responsible for creating of the Futurity Stakes in 1888.

The stakes were later run at Belmont Park on Long Island as a Grade II race on the dirt. The race continued to be run there (except for the Belmont Park redevelopment period from 1962 to 1968) until it was removed from the calendar in 2005 by the New York Racing Association (NYRA) as a cost-cutting measure. For 70 years, the Lawrence Realization was one of the most prestigious annual events in the American horse racing calendar.

Only two horses contested the race in 1918, 1920, 1944, and 1946; however, due to the large number of entries in 1976 and 1985 it was run in two divisions.

The race was contested over several distances: 
 1⅝ miles : 1889–1913, 1918–1969
 1½ miles : 1916–1917, 1970–2004
 1⅛ miles : 2005

Records
On September 4, 1920, Man o' War won the 1⅝-mile Lawrence Realization by 100 lengths over the only other runner, Hoodwink. His time for the race was 2:40 4/5, which broke the world record for the distance by 1 3/5 seconds and was his fifth record-setting performance that year. The great Kelso tied the record in 1960.

Records for distance
 At 1½ miles : 2:25.94 – Parade Ground (1998)
 At 1⅝ miles : 2:40.80 – Man o' War (1920)
 At 1⅝ miles : 2:40.80 – Kelso  (1960)

Most wins by a jockey
 5 – Braulio Baeza (1961, 1966, 1967, 1968, 1972)
 5 – Eddie Arcaro (1935, 1939, 1952, 1959, 1960)

Most wins by a trainer
 8 – "Sunny Jim" Fitzsimmons (1924, 1925, 1930, 1932, 1934, 1936, 1938, 1940)

Most wins by an owner
 6 – Belair Stud (1924, 1925, 1930, 1932, 1936, 1940)

Winners

* † In 1919, Over There finished first but was disqualified.

See also
Aqueduct Racetrack
Belmont Park
Man o' War

References

Graded stakes races in the United States
Belmont Stakes
Sheepshead Bay Race Track
Flat horse races for three-year-olds
Horse races in the United States
Turf races in the United States
Discontinued horse races